The Mountain Pacific Sports Federation (MPSF) is a college athletic conference with members located mostly in the western United States, although it now has members as far east as Pennsylvania. The conference participates at the NCAA Division I level, primarily in Olympic sports that are not directly sponsored by a school's home conference (such as the Pac-12 and Big West, whose members all participate in MPSF competition in at least one of its sports).

History
The MPSF was founded in 1992 and specifically created to provide an outlet for competition in non-revenue-producing Olympic sports. The MPSF conducts championships in men's volleyball; women's lacrosse; and indoor track, gymnastics, and water polo for both men and women. In 2010 the MPSF added women's swimming and diving to its list of sports, and added that sport for men in the 2011–12 season. The 2012–13 school year was the last for MPSF competition in men's soccer.

The conference's membership varies by sport; 39 schools are MPSF members in at least one of its sponsored sports. Schools are not required to participate in the MPSF competition for each sponsored sport if their primary conference affiliation sponsors a competition in that sport (e.g. Pac-12 soccer and women's gymnastics).

All MPSF members have a primary conference affiliation. All Pac-12 and Big West Conference members house at least one sport in the MPSF. The West Coast Conference is represented by six schools (BYU, Pacific, Pepperdine, Portland, Saint Mary's, San Diego), and the Mountain West Conference is represented by Air Force and San Jose State. Ten conferences are represented by one school each – the Allegheny Mountain Collegiate Conference (Penn State Behrend), the Big 12 Conference (Oklahoma), the Big Sky Conference (Sacramento State), the Big Ten Conference (Indiana), the California Collegiate Athletic Association (UC San Diego), the Great Northwest Athletic Conference (Alaska–Anchorage), the Pacific West Conference (Concordia–Irvine), the Southern Collegiate Athletic Conference (Austin), the Southland Conference (Incarnate Word), and the Western Athletic Conference (Grand Canyon).

Al Beaird was the first Executive Director of the MPSF for 24 years, from 1998 to 2021. Foti Mellis became the second executive director on June 1, 2021. Mellis was a Senior Associate Athletic Director at the University of California.

Members
Source:

Current members

Former members

Notes

Sports
The Mountain Pacific Sports Federation sponsors championship competition in five men's and five women's NCAA sanctioned sports The MPSF dropped men's soccer after the 2012 season. The moves of Denver (all sports) and New Mexico (soccer only) to other conferences left the MPSF with six soccer members, but all six would soon leave due to moves by the Western Athletic Conference. MPSF soccer member Seattle was already in the WAC, and another MPSF soccer school, CSU Bakersfield, was already committed to join the WAC in 2013. Because the WAC dropped football after the 2012 season due to a near-complete membership turnover, it needed to add another men's sport to maintain its Division I status. To that end, it invited the four remaining MPSF soccer schools to join them; all accepted, and the WAC began sponsoring men's soccer in 2013–14.

In October 2015, Arizona State announced that it would elevate its club team in women's lacrosse to full varsity status starting in the 2017–18 school year (2018 season), which will give the Pac-12 six women's lacrosse schools. This number is required by league bylaws for official sponsorship of a sport, and is also the number of teams required for a conference to be an automatic NCAA tournament qualifier. This led the Pac-12 to announce that all of its women's lacrosse teams would leave the MPSF for the new Pac-12 lacrosse league for the 2018 season. The four remaining MPSF lacrosse schools will retain that league's automatic NCAA tournament bid for the 2018 and 2019 seasons while the MPSF seeks to add new members in that sport.

The next major change in conference membership came in January 2016, when the Golden Coast Conference, a water polo-only league that previously operated only a women's competition, announced it would add a men's division effective with the 2016–17 season. The GCC took six of the 10 members of the MPSF men's water polo league, leaving the MPSF with only the four Pac-12 members that sponsor the sport.

On May 31, 2016, the Big West Conference announced that it would begin sponsoring men's volleyball in the 2017–18 school year (2018 season). The Big West men's volleyball league now includes five full members Long Beach State, Cal State Northridge, UC Irvine, UC Santa Barbara and Hawai'i, plus associate member UC San Diego. The full Big West members remain in the MPSF in other sports, but UC San Diego exited the federation. California Baptist also exited the MPSF after dropping its only conference sport of men's volleyball shortly after the 2017 season, and Cal State Bakersfield left the MPSF after dropping its last remaining conference sport of women's water polo at the same time.

It was announced in August 2021 that the MPSF would add men's and women's fencing to the conference as the tenth sport. 

It was announced in September 2021 that the MPSF would add women's artistic swimming to the conference as the eleventh sport.

Membership by sport

Conference champions

Men's gymnastics

Women's gymnastics

Women's lacrosse

Men's soccer

Men's swimming & diving

Women's swimming & diving

Men's track & field indoor

Women's track & field indoor

Men's volleyball

Men's water polo

Women's water polo

NCAA titles
The Mountain Pacific Sports Federation has won 100 NCAA titles in seven sports. UCLA has won 25 national titles. Stanford has won 20 titles. USC has won 16 titles. Oregon has won 12 titles. Oklahoma has won nine titles. California has won six titles. UC Irvine has won four titles. Arizona State and Brigham Young have won three titles. Pepperdine has won two titles. The MPSF has won every men's and women's water polo NCAA title since the inception of the conference.

Men's gymnastics

Men's soccer

Men's track & field indoor

Women's track & field indoor

Men's volleyball

† — Vacated due to NCAA violations

Men's water polo

Women's water polo

References

External links 
 

 
NCAA Division I conferences
Sports organizations established in 1992
1992 establishments in the United States